The United Kingdom held a national preselection to choose the song that would go to the Eurovision Song Contest 1962. It was held on 11 February 1962 and presented by David Jacobs.

"Ring-a-Ding Girl" won the national, performed by Ronnie Carroll went on to come 4th in the contest.

Before Eurovision

A Song for Europe 1962

At Eurovision
"Ring-a-Ding Girl" won the national and went on to come equal 4th in the contest, with the orchestra conducted by Wally Stott, who in 1972, transitioned to become Angela Morley.

Voting

References

1962
Countries in the Eurovision Song Contest 1962
Eurovision
Eurovision